Bruce Edward Babbitt (born June 27, 1938) is an American attorney and politician who served as the 47th United States Secretary of the Interior from 1993 to 2001 under President Bill Clinton. He previously served as the 16th governor of Arizona from 1978 to 1987 and was a candidate for President of the United States in the 1988 Democratic primaries. 

He won election as Arizona attorney general after graduating from Harvard Law School. He became Governor of Arizona after the death of his predecessor, Wesley Bolin. Babbitt won election to a full term in 1978 and won re-election in 1982. He focused on tax reform, health care, and water management.  He helped found the Democratic Leadership Council and sought the 1988 Democratic presidential nomination, but dropped out of the race after the first set of primaries.

From 1988 to 1992, Babbitt served as head of the League of Conservation Voters. Clinton strongly considered nominating Babbitt to the Supreme Court after vacancies arose in 1993 and 1994. After leaving public office in 2001, Babbitt became an attorney with Latham & Watkins.

Personal life
Babbitt was born into a prominent Roman Catholic Flagstaff, Arizona family, the son of Frances B. (Perry) and Paul James Babbitt Sr. His family owned a department store in Flagstaff, a ranch in northern Arizona, and Indian trading posts. He graduated from the University of Notre Dame, attended Newcastle University in the United Kingdom on a Marshall Scholarship, and then received his J.D. degree at Harvard Law School.

He married Harriet Coons (known as Hattie) in 1968. She has worked as an attorney in Arizona and Washington, D.C., and served as United States Ambassador to the Organization of American States from 1993 to 1997, and as Deputy Administrator of the United States Agency for International Development from 1997 to 2001 during the Clinton Administration.

As attorney for the Scottsdale Daily Progress newspaper, Babbitt worked with publisher Jonathan Marshall in crafting legislation that became Arizona's "open meeting law."

Political career

Arizona

In the state election of November 1974, Babbitt overcame Republican incumbent N. Warner Lee to become Attorney General of Arizona.

He succeeded Wesley Bolin as governor when Bolin died in office on March 4, 1978. Arizona does not have a lieutenant governor; the Arizona Secretary of State, if holding office by election, stands first in line in case the governor vacates his or her post. However, Rose Mofford, then secretary of state, had been appointed to her post and thus was not eligible to become governor according to the Arizona state constitution. Babbitt, as attorney general, was next in the line of succession, and thus served the balance of the term to which Raúl Héctor Castro had originally been elected in 1974. Babbitt was elected for a full four-year term later in 1978, and again in 1982. He did not run for a third full term in 1986.

In 1982, Babbitt intervened in negotiations between the Cochise County sheriff and leaders of the Christ Miracle Healing Church and Center over the release of church members whom the church was hiding from facing charges for assault.  The church, which had been implicated in bomb-making, would play a central role in the Miracle Valley shootout later that year.  In 1983, Babbitt sent the Arizona National Guard to the strike against the Phelps Dodge mining company in Morenci, Arizona.

With the retirement of Republican Barry Goldwater from the U.S. Senate in 1986, many in Arizona expected Babbitt to oppose Representative John McCain for the seat. In a surprise press conference in 1985, Babbitt instead announced he would forgo the Senate race to concentrate on a White House bid in 1988.

National work
In 1979, Babbitt was appointed by President Jimmy Carter to serve as a commissioner on the President's Commission on the Accident at Three Mile Island, a six-month investigation of the March 1979 accident at a commercial nuclear power plant at Middletown, Pennsylvania. Babbitt spoke at the 1980 Democratic National Convention, which nominated incumbent Jimmy Carter as the Democratic candidate for president.

A founding member of the Democratic Leadership Council and the chairman of the Democratic Governors Association in 1985, Babbitt sought the Democratic Party's 1988 nomination for President of the United States. Among his proposals was a national sales tax to remedy the then-record budget deficits piled up during the several past administrations. He enjoyed positive press attention (called a "boomlet" in USA Today), but after finishing out of the top tier of candidates in the Iowa caucuses and New Hampshire primary, he dropped out of the race. In an intentional reference to Richard Nixon (who said after losing the California governorship in the 1962 election that the press "won't have [me] to kick around anymore"), Babbitt joked in his last campaign press conference that the media "won't have Bruce Babbitt to puff up anymore." The Washington Post reported that Babbitt dropped this line from the prepared text of his withdrawal speech.

Secretary of the Interior 1993–2001

After leading the League of Conservation Voters, Babbitt served for eight years, 1993–2001, as the Secretary of the Interior during the Presidency of Bill Clinton.  According to John D. Leshy:
His most remembered legacies will likely be his advocacy of environmental restoration, his efforts to safeguard and build support for the ESA [the Endangered Species Act of 1973] and the biodiversity the that it helps protect, and the public land conservation measures that flowered on his watch.

Babbitt worked to protect scenic and historic areas of America's federal public lands. In 2000 Babbitt created the National Landscape Conservation System, a collection of 15 U.S. National Monuments and 14 National Conservation Areas to be managed by the Bureau of Land Management in such a way as to keep them "healthy, open, and wild."

A major issue involved low fees charged ranchers who grazed cattle on public lands. The "animal unit month" (AUM) fee was only $1.35 and was far below the 1983 market value. The argument was that the federal government in effect was subsidizing ranchers, with a few major corporations controlling millions of acres of grazing land.  Babbitt tried to rally environmentalists and raise fees, but senators from Western states successfully blocked his proposals.

In 1993, Babbitt was seriously considered by President Clinton to replace retiring United States Supreme Court Justice Byron White. Due to his lead on environmental issues, however, Clinton nominated Ruth Bader Ginsburg instead. Clinton again considered Babbitt for the high court in 1994 when Harry Blackmun announced his retirement. Babbitt was passed over again, this time in favor of Stephen Breyer, due to Breyer's immense support in the U.S. Senate, primarily because he was close to Sen. Ted Kennedy.

In 1998 Babbitt was the subject of a federal grand jury investigation into whether he had lied to Congress about having denied an Indian casino license in Wisconsin in return for political donations. The controversy has been called Wampumgate. Babbitt was cleared of wrongdoing in the special prosecutor's final report on the investigation the following year.

Post-political life

Babbitt took a job as chief counsel of the environmental litigation department of Latham & Watkins, an international law firm, after leaving the Department of the Interior. During his time at Latham & Watkins, Babbitt offended many environmentalists by taking on two clients trying to build large developments near the coastline. Babbitt defended both projects, one on Hearst Corporation land in central California and the other on the Ahmanson Ranch north of Los Angeles.

Babbitt has attracted the ire of some environmentalists and Native American groups for his representation of the Arizona Snowbowl ski resort and its effort to expand the resort and use waste water to make artificial snow.

He serves as trustee of the World Wildlife Fund Secretariat Trustees in the U.S., and was a member of the Council on Foreign Relations until 2012. He has also served on the Board of Directors since 2009 for the Amazon Conservation Association, whose mission is to conserve the biological diversity of the Amazon. Babbitt is also a member of the ReFormers Caucus of Issue One.

See also
 
 Bill Clinton Supreme Court candidates

References

Further reading
 Babbitt, Bruce, ed. Grand Canyon: An Anthology (Flagstaff: Northland Press, 1978). 258 pages online review
 Babbitt, Bruce. "Federalism and the Environment: An Intergovernmental Perspective of the Sagebrush Rebellion." Environmental Law 12.4 (1982): 847–861 online.
 Babbitt, Bruce. "The Public Interest in Western Water" Environmental Law  23 (1993): 933+. online
 Babbitt, Bruce. "The Endangered Species Act and Takings: A Call for Innovation Within the Terms of the Act." Environmental Law 24 (1994): 355+.
 Babbitt, Bruce. Cities in the wilderness: A new vision of land use in America (Island Press, 2007).
 
 Hill, Julie Andersen. "Public Lands Council v. Babbitt: Herding Ranchers Off Public Land." BYU Law Review (2000): 1273+ online.
 
 Leshy, John D. "The Babbitt Legacy at the Department of the Interior: A Preliminary View." Environmental Law 31 (2001): 199–227. online.
 Melling, Tom. "Bruce Babbitt's Use of Governmental Dispute Resolution: A Mid-Term Report Card." Land & Water Law Review 30 (1995): 57+.
 Rose, Jonathan. "Executive Oversight of Rulemaking in Arizona: The Governor's Regulatory Review Council – The First Three Years." Arizona State Law Journal  (1985): 425+.

External links
 "Bruce Babbitt," Arizona Historymakers: Biography (2005)
 "Bruce Babbitt Oral History" Arizona Historymakers (2012)
 Exit Interview
 

|-

|-

|-

|-

|-

1938 births
20th-century American politicians
Alumni of Newcastle University
American environmental lawyers
American people of Welsh descent
American prosecutors
Arizona Attorneys General
Candidates in the 1988 United States presidential election
Catholics from Arizona
Clinton administration cabinet members
Democratic Party governors of Arizona
Harvard Law School alumni
Living people
Marshall Scholars
People associated with Latham & Watkins
People from Flagstaff, Arizona
Politicians from Phoenix, Arizona
United States Secretaries of the Interior
University of Notre Dame alumni